Kari Peters (born November 17, 1985 in Dudelange, Luxembourg) is a Luxembourger cross-country skier. He competed for Luxembourg at the 2014 Winter Olympics in the Sprint event. He was also scheduled to compete in the 15 kilometre classical event, but withdrew due to suffering from a severe cold.

Kari Peters was named as the athlete to represent the country after he met the standard of less than 100 FIS Points set by the Luxembourgian Olympic and Sporting Committee. Peters is also the first ever athlete to qualify in cross-country skiing for the country. He will be the first cross-country skier to represent his country.

Peters was also selected to carry the Luxembourg flag during the opening ceremony.

See also
Luxembourg at the 2014 Winter Olympics

References

1985 births
Living people
Luxembourgian male cross-country skiers
Cross-country skiers at the 2014 Winter Olympics
Olympic cross-country skiers of Luxembourg
People from Dudelange